The oblique ridges cross the subscapular fossa from superomedial to inferiolateral (parallel to scapular spine). These ridges are formed by intramuscular tendons of the subscapularis muscle.

The costal or ventral surface of the scapula presents a broad concavity, the subscapular fossa. The medial two-thirds of the fossa are marked by several oblique ridges, which run lateralward and upward. The ridges give attachment to the tendinous insertions, and the surfaces between them to the fleshy fibers, of the subscapularis muscle.

Additional images

See also
 Subscapular fossa
 Subscapularis muscle

References

Scapula